Gao Beibei (born February 8, 1975) is a Chinese sprint canoeist who competed in the mid-1990s. She won a silver medal in the K-4 500 m event at the 1995 ICF Canoe Sprint World Championships in Duisburg; She currently serves as a coach in Water Sports Administration Center of Shandong, the executive coach of Chinese Canoeing Team.

Gao also competed at the 1996 Summer Olympics in Atlanta, finishing fourth in the K-4 500 m event, while being eliminated in the semifinals of the K-1 500 m event.

Born in Weifang, Gao is the executive coach of National Women's Canoeing Team, the head coach of Water Sports Centre of Shandong (the former Shandong Water Sports School).

References

1975 births
Living people
People from Weifang
Canoeists from Shandong
Olympic canoeists of China
Canoeists at the 1996 Summer Olympics
Asian Games medalists in canoeing
ICF Canoe Sprint World Championships medalists in kayak
Canoeists at the 1994 Asian Games
Canoeists at the 1998 Asian Games
Chinese female canoeists
Medalists at the 1994 Asian Games
Medalists at the 1998 Asian Games
Asian Games gold medalists for China